Josef Venantius von Wöss (13 June 1863 – 22 October 1943) was a Viennese church musician, composer, teacher of harmony and music publishing lector. He is known for piano transcriptions of large-scale works by Gustav Mahler for Universal Edition.

Life and career 
Wöss was born in Cattaro, Kingdom of Dalmatia (now Montenegro), the son of an Austrian army captain (Hauptmann). The family moved to Vienna in 1866, where he received his first piano instruction from his mother and his uncle, Richard Löffler. He studied music from 1880 at the Konservatorium der Gesellschaft der Musikfreunde with Franz Krenn. From 1882, he worked as choral conductor of several men's choruses. He was a music teacher at the Militär-Oberrealschule in Mährisch Weißkirchen from 1886 to 1889. He then worked in Vienna as Korrektor for the Notenstecherei Waldheim-Eberle, a music publisher, until 1907. He also taught harmony at the Kirchenmusik-Vereinsschule of the Votivkirche in 1892 and 1893.

Wöss worked for Universal Edition in Vienna from 1908 to 1931, where he focused on piano reductions and arrangements. These included Mahler's symphonies with vocal parts (3, 4 and 8), Das klagende Lied and Das Lied von der Erde. For the latter, he also wrote a thematic analysis, including complete referencing of the texts. He also worked on publications of works by Anton Bruckner and Richard Wagner. In the 1899/1900 season, he conducted a concert of the Wiener Singakademie. He was also reporter for the trade journal Musica divina, and a member of the society Denkmäler der Tonkunst in Österreich. He was awarded the title professor in 1926.

Wöss died in Vienna at age 80, and was buried in the Hernalser Friedhof where he was granted a grave of honour.

Work 
Wöss composed mainly sacred music and chamber music. His sacred music followed the ideas of the Cecilian Movement.

Choral sacred compositions by Wöss include:

Masses 
 Missa in coena Domini, Op. 3g, in F major for mixed choir a cappella
 Missa in Honorem Beatae Mariae Virginis, Op. 32a No. 2, in C minor
 Messe zu Ehren der Hl. Cäcilia, Op. 32a No. 3, for mixed choirand organ, in E minor
 Missa in adorationem Ss. Trinitatis, Op. 45, for soloists, mixed choir, wind instruments and timpani (or organ)
 Missa in honorem Ss. Innocentium, Op. 62, in E major, for mixed choir and organ

Other major works 
 Te Deum in C major, Op. 3a 
 Requiem breve in G major, Op. 3f, for mixed choir and organ
 Te Deum in E minor, Op. 57, for mixed choir, organ and orchestra (or only organ)

Hymn melodies 
Two of his hymn melodies, both to texts by Guido Maria Dreves, are contained in the German Catholic hymnal Gotteslob: "Gelobt seist du, Herr Jesu Christ" (GL 375) and "Ein Danklied sei dem Herrn" (GL 382).

Mahler transcriptions 
Wöss published many piano arrangements for Universal Editions, including:
 Das klagende Lied: vocal score with piano reduction
 Symphony No. 3: arrangement for piano duet 
 Symphony No. 4: arrangement for piano duet
 Symphony No. 8: piano arrangement/s
 Das Lied von der Erde: vocal score with piano reduction (1912)
 Symphony No. 9: arrangement for piano duet (1912)

References

External link

 

1863 births
1943 deaths
Austrian male composers